Constantin Uţă (born 10 May 1962) is a Romanian wrestler. He competed in the men's Greco-Roman 62 kg at the 1984 Summer Olympics.

References

External links
 

1962 births
Living people
Romanian male sport wrestlers
Olympic wrestlers of Romania
Wrestlers at the 1984 Summer Olympics
Sportspeople from Câmpulung